Meng Fanqi (born 18 September 1998) is a Chinese biathlete. She competed in the 2022 Winter Olympics.

Career
Meng started biathlon in 2013. Meng won a gold medal at the 2016 Winter Youth Olympics in the single relay. She also won a gold medal at the 2019 Junior World Championships in the individual event. She competed in multiple biathlon events at the 2022 Winter Olympics. She was part of the Chinese team in the mixed relay, placing 15th out of 20 teams. She placed 47th in the individual event, 62nd in the sprint, and 12th with the Chinese team in the women's relay.

References

1998 births
Living people
Biathletes at the 2022 Winter Olympics
Chinese female biathletes
Olympic biathletes of China
Sportspeople from Jilin City
Biathletes at the 2016 Winter Youth Olympics
Biathletes at the 2017 Asian Winter Games
Youth Olympic gold medalists for China
21st-century Chinese women